The 2019 Mississippi Attorney General election was held on November 5, 2019, to elect the Attorney General of Mississippi. Incumbent Jim Hood declined to seek re-election to a fifth term, instead running unsuccessfully for Governor. State Treasurer Lynn Fitch won the Republican nomination in a primary runoff against Andy Taggart, and she defeated Democratic nominee Jennifer Riley Collins in the general election. Fitch became the first Republican to hold the office since 1878, as well as the first woman to ever be elected to the position in state history. It also marked the first time in over a century where no members of the Democratic Party held statewide office.

Republican primary

Candidates

Nominee
Lynn Fitch, Treasurer of Mississippi

Eliminated in runoff
Andy Taggart, Madison County supervisor

Eliminated in primary
Mark Baker, member of the Mississippi House of Representatives from the 74th District

Runoff

Democratic primary

Candidates

Nominee
Jennifer Riley Collins, former director of the American Civil Liberties Union of Mississippi
Declined

Jim Hood, incumbent Attorney General (Ran for Governor)

Results

General election

Results

References

Attorney General
Mississippi
Mississippi Attorney General elections